Lanzi is an Italian surname. Notable people with the surname include:

Enrico Lanzi (born 1953), Italian footballer and manager
François Lanzi (1916–1988), French artist
Gaetano Lanzi (1905–1980), Italian boxer
Lorenzo Lanzi (born 1981), Italian motorcycle racer
Luigi Lanzi (1732–1810), Italian art historian and archaeologist
Mario Lanzi (1914–1980), Italian middle-distance runner

Italian-language surnames